Giani Ditt Singh (21 April 1853–1901) was a historian, scholar, poet, editor and an eminent Singh Sabha reformer. Singh wrote over 70 books on Sikhism, the most famous of which is Khalsa Akhbar. His Dayanand naal mera Samvaad and Durga Parbodh are considered major texts of Sikh philosophy. He was born in the village of Kalaur in Fatehgarh Sahib district.

Early life 

There is little information regarding the early life of Singh, despite a resurgence of interest in him caused by the desire of some people to recast his life as that of a dalit hero. Anshu Malhotra has argued that such a recasting says more about the motives of the present-day researchers than it does about the effects of social status on Singh himself.

While Singh's date of birth is generally recognised as being 21 April, the year is variously stated as 1850, 1852 and 1853. He father, Diwan Singh whose knowledge of the Nyaya and Vedanta religious philosophies was passed on to his son. The family origins lay in the Ravidasia caste of Chamar.

After initial schooling given by his father, Singh was sent at the age of 8 or 9 to be taught by Gurbakhsh Singh and Lala Dayanand in the village of Tiur, Ambala district. There he studied Gurmukhi, Urdu and Persian, as well as prosody, Niti Shastra and Vedanta, until aged around 16. Gurbakhsh Singh was an adherent of the Gulabdasi sect and his pupil's next move was to the Gulabdasi centre at Chathian Wala, near Lahore.

Formally initiated into the sect of Sant Desa Singh, he became a Gulabdasi preacher. Not long afterwards, he came under the influence of Bhai Jawahar Singh, formerly a follower of Gulabdasi sect, who had joined the Arya Samaj.

Early reform activities
Soon, Singh was drawn into the Sikh fold through Bhai Gurmukh Singh, then an active figure in the Singh Sabha movement. In 1886, he became a principal contributor to and subsequently the second editor of the weekly Khalsa Akhbar Lahore, a newspaper founded by Bhai Gurmukh Singh following the establishment of the Lahore Khalsa Diwan.

Singh He had passed the Gyani examination the same year and was appointed a teacher at the Oriental College. He used the Khalsa Akhbar as a vehicle for the spread of Singh Sabha ideology.

When the Amritsar Khalsa Diwan excommunicated Bhai Gurmukh Singh, Ditt Singh responded by publishing excerpts from his book Svapan Natak, a thinly veiled satire ridiculing the Amritsar leaders, in the Khalsa Akhbar.  This resulted in a lawsuit filed by one of the targets of the satire, which, although eventually dismissed, cost the Khalsa Akhbar dearly in time and money to defend.  The paper shut down in 1889.  With support from the Maharaja of Nahba, the paper resumed publication in 1893, again under Ditt Singh as editor.  This led to the eventual launch of an English-language weekly, titled simply Khalsa.

Through all of his Sikh Sabha activities, Singh had maintained his ties to the Arya Samaj, but in 1888, the increasing discord between the Arya Samaj and Sikh leaders led to Singh's ultimate departure from the movement.  After this, he threw himself entirely into the work of the Singh Sabha movement.

As an educator, Singh helped in the setting up of Khalsa College, Amritsar, and wrote textbooks for the students of the college.

Discussion with Swami Dayanand
Swami Dayanand was the founder of the Arya Samaj movement, but Singh found Dayanand's belief in the supremacy of the Vedas and the role of Hinduism as the sole true religion at odds with the multi-cultural and multi-religious world of the time.  Singh planned to set things right. During a religious gathering in 1877 at Lahore, Singh visited Dayanand "to know his mind and to know his ideals". Singh published these dialogues in his book Sadhu Daya Nand Naal Mera Sambad. During the course of the discussion, Singh takes issue with Dayanand's beliefs, and attempts to expose the fallacies therein. Malhotra describes the discussions with Dayanand as "putative" and the booklet as "controversial".

Literary career
Singh wrote prolifically, producing both prose and verse. He wrote books and pamphlets on Sikh theology and history and on current polemics.

Well-known among his works are:

 Guru Nanak Prabodh
 Guru Arjan Chariltar
 Dambh Bidaran
 Durga Prabodh
 Panth Prabodh
 Raj Prabodh
 Mera ate Sadhu Dayanand da Sambad
 Naqh Siah Prabodh
 Panth Sudhar Binai Pattar
 Abla Naari

He also published accounts of the martyrdoms of Tara Singh of Van, Subeg Singh, Matab Singh Mirankotia, Taru Singh and Bota Singh.

Personal life
Singh's married Bishan Kaur in a Sikh rite in Lahore in 1880. They had two children: a son, Baldev Singh, born in 1886, and a daughter, Vidyavant Kaur, born in 1890.

Death
The death of Singh's daughter on 17 June 1901 was a great blow to Singh, who was already suffering exhaustion from his workload as leader of the Singh Sabha movement. He continued to work, but his health deteriorated rapidly and he fell seriously ill. Singh died at Lahore on 6 September 1901.

Memorials
After Singh's death, Bhai Vir Singh wrote a poem in his honor that was published in the Khalsa Akhbar.  In addition, the Giani Ditt Singh Memorial International Society regularly organizes functions to keep Singh's memory alive.

References

 Pritam Singh Collections of Giani Ditt Singh
 
 Amar Singh, Giani, Singh Sabha Lahir de Ughe Sanchalak Giani
 Ditt Singh Ji. Amritsar, 1902
 Singh, Daljit. Singh Sabha de Modhi Giani Ditt Sirigh Ji. Amritsar, 1951
 Singh, Jagjit. Singh Sabha Lahir. Ludhiana, 1974
 Singh, Harbans. The Heritage of the Sikhs. Delhi,1983
 Jolly, Surjit Kaur. Sikh Revivalist Movements. Delhi,1988
 Chandar, Gurmukh Singh, My Attempted Excommunication from the Sikh Temples and the Khalsa Community at Fandkot in 1887. Lahore, 1898 Cds. S.

Sikh politics
Indian Sikhs
People from Fatehgarh Sahib
Indian independence activists from Punjab (British India)
Punjabi people
1850s births
1901 deaths